The Jane Schaffer method is a formula for essay writing that is taught in some U.S. middle schools and high schools. Developed by a San Diego teacher named Jane Schaffer, who started offering training and a 45-day curriculum in 1995, it is intended to help students who struggle with structuring essays by providing a framework. Originally developed for personal narratives and essays about literature, the curriculum now also covers expository and argument essays.

Essay structure
The essay is to consist of an introduction three or more sentences long and containing a thesis statement, a conclusion incorporating all the writer's commentary and bringing the essay to a close, and two or three body paragraphs; Schaffer herself preferred to teach a four-paragraph essay rather than the traditional five-paragraph essay.

Body paragraph structure
Each body paragraph should consist of eight sentences: a topic sentence (T) followed by two "chunks" made up of a sentence presenting a concrete detail (CD) such as a fact, quotation, plot point, or example, followed by two sentences of commentary on that material (CM), and then by a concluding sentence (CS). To help students internalize this formula, teachers use methods including colored pens and writing "fact, opinion, opinion, fact, opinion, opinion" in the margin. Longer body paragraphs are possible but must maintain the same 1:2 ratio of CD to CM in the "chunks".

Commentary sentences often start with a transition such as the following:
 This (also) shows that
 This is (important) because
 In addition
 Furthermore
 Therefore
 Also
 For example

Conclusion sentences usually start with one of the following:
 Finally 
 In a word 
 In brief, Briefly
 In conclusion, To conclude
 In the end
 In the final analysis 
 On the whole 
 Thus, to conclude 
 To summarize, In sum, To sum up, In summary
 Mostly
 As a result
 Therefore

Critical analysis
Mark Wiley, coordinator of the composition program at California State University, Long Beach, evaluated the Schaffer method in 2000 as providing a valuable guide to the basics of academic writing, but not conducive to students' exploring their own responses to complex ideas and best taught as a possible strategy.

The Schaffer method has been studied in several master's theses in education. In 2002, Heather McClelland sought to evaluate the effect of teaching formulaic strategies in order to assist teachers. In 2012, Richard Roybal taught the method to a group of 60 8th-grade students and reviewed their success in stating a thesis and formulating three supporting topic sentences in an essay about a work of literature; 40% had three topic sentences, but 62% had two. In 2015, Patricia Solomon related instruction in scientific writing for a high school course in biology to the students' Schaffer method instruction in writing about literature; she found little evidence of transfer of learning to the new field.

References

External links
Jane Schaffer Academic Writing Program

Writing
Essays
Pedagogy